Bhikusa Yamasa Kshatriya (Sinnar) College of Commerce was started in 1957 in the city of Nashik in India. B.Y.K. (Sinnar) College is affiliated to the University of Pune. The institution has more than 6000 students with more than 250 teaching and non-teaching staff. The campus is spread over an area of 12 acres. 

It is recognized by the University Grants Commission under Section 2f and 12(B) of the UGC Act. The college is under the aegis of Gokhale Education Society, Nashik.

Programs

Undergraduate
 Bachelor of Commerce - Accountancy and Auditing
 Bachelor of Commerce - Business Administration
 Bachelor of Commerce - Business Entrepreneurship
 Bachelor of Commerce - Business Law and Practice
Bachelor of Business Administration
Bachelor of Computer Application

Postgraduate
 Master of Commerce
 Master of Computer Applications
 Master of Business Administration

Library
Library services are partly computerized with a reading room capacity of 200 students across 300.80 sq. meters. A book bank facility is provided to student. There are separate reading rooms for boys and girls. A separate faculty reading room is available.

A range of newspapers are provided to the students. Special services offered to competitive are NET/SET students. Internet services are available at the library. However, there are no international journals.

Notable alumni
G. R. Khairnar
Ashok Chavan, Former CM- Maharashtra
Shri.Abhijit Khandkekar - Known Marathi celebrity and Actor 
Ms. Anuradha Dongaonkar(Sports) Sports player- Kabbadi

Picture Gallery

External links

 Bhikusa Yamasa Kshatriya (Sinnar) College of Commerce website

Commerce colleges in India
Universities and colleges in Maharashtra
Colleges affiliated to Savitribai Phule Pune University
Education in Nashik
Educational institutions established in 1957
1957 establishments in Bombay State